Damon is a masculine given name. It is the English form of the Greek masculine name  Damōn, derived from  damazein, meaning "to overpower, tame, subdue, conquer".

People
Damon of Athens, 5th century BC Athenian musicologist
Damon of Thessalonica, 2nd century BC Macedonian statesman
Damon Albarn (born 1968), British songwriter and musician
Damon Allen (born 1963), American football player
Damon Amendolara, American sports radio host
Damon Arnette (born 1996), American football player
Damon Bailey (born 1971), American basketball player and coach
Damon Beesley, English writer and television producer
Damon Berryhill (born 1963), Major League Baseball catcher
Damon Bossino, Gibraltarian barrister and politician 
Damon Bruce, American sports radio host
Damon Buffini, English businessman
Damon Buford (born 1970), Major League Baseball player
Damon Che, rock drummer and guitarist
Damon Dash (born 1971), American music industry executive
Damon Dunn, American politician
Damon Duval, American football player 
Damon Elliott (born 1973), American musician 
Damon Galgut (born 1963), South African writer 
Damon Gupton (born 1973), American actor 
Damon Harrison (born 1988), American football player
Damon Hill (born 1960), British Formula One driver
Damon Huard (born 1973), American football player
Damon Knight, American science fiction writer
Damon Lindelof (born 1973), American screenwriter 
Damon M. Cummings (1910–1942), United States Navy officer
Damon Pieri (born 1970), American football player
Damon Runyon (1884–1946), American newspaperman and writer
Damon Severson (born 1994), Canadian ice hockey defenseman
Damon Sheehy-Guiseppi (born 1994), American football player
Damon Stoudamire (born 1973), American basketball player
Damon Stryker, former alias of Canadian pro wrestler Adam Copeland
Damon Thomas (disambiguation), several people
Damon Tweedy, American physician and academic
Damon Wayans (born 1960), American comedic actor
Damon Webb (born 1995), American football player

Fictional characters
Damon, in the Greek legend of Damon and Pythias
Damon Carter, in the American television series Soul Food
Damon Salvatore, in L. J. Smith's novel series The Vampire Diaries and the television series
Damon Gant, a police chief in the video game Phoenix Wright: Ace Attorney
Damon Baird, in the Gears of War franchise
Damon Henderson, in the American television series Power Rangers Lost Galaxy.

See also
 Damon (surname)
 Damien (disambiguation)

References

Masculine given names
Greek masculine given names
English masculine given names